The State Library and Archives of Florida is the central repository for the archives of state government for the state of Florida. It is located at the R.A. Gray Building on 500 South Bronough Street in Tallahassee, Florida, Florida's capital.

Mandated by state law, the Florida State Archives is assigned to collect, preserve, and make available for research the historically significant records of Florida. It also stores and makes available private manuscripts and correspondence, local government records, photographs, maps, film clips, and materials that complement the official state records and Florida history.

Many photos from the Florida Photographic Collection are used frequently for articles on Wikipedia and assist users in describing events in Florida history. A selection of archival items from the State Library and Archives are available through the digital outreach program Florida Memory.

History
The State Library and Archives of Florida was a library of humble beginnings in the year 1845. Shortly after its admission as a state, the legislature began to realize the vital and crucial need to preserve, protect, and collect documents about the history of Florida. During that same legislative meeting, a statute was enacted naming the "Secretary of State" responsible for the care, collection, organization, and display of all "books and maps belonging to the state be collected together (Florida's 'State' Library, 1909). It was also said in the statute that all such documents be cataloged as thoroughly as possible. However, this task was neglected, and as a result, the library and archives suffered (Florida's 'State' Library, 1909).

According to the Florida Historical Society's article during the administration of Dr. Jno. L. Crawford, "a space in the upper corridor of the Capitol was partitioned off and furnished with shelving, and a large number of the (apparently) most valuable of the books, maps, etc., was deposited there; and many such occupied shelves are in the office of the Secretary" (Florida's 'State' Library, 1909). However, when the Capital was remodeled in 1902, the commissioners intended to create space to accommodate the growing library but failed to do so. H. Clay Crawford, Secretary of State at the time, placed shelving on the either side of the basement walls and moved several books unarranged and uncatalogued where they were left in the dusty damp air. It is undetermined just how many documents of historical value lay untouched and neglected in the basement of the State Library, and it was not until some sixty years later that the library flourished as a historical point or reference for its patrons.

The State Library would prosper under William Thomas (W.T.) Cash. Cash had been a teacher and experience working in the Florida House of Representatives and the Florida Senate. He wrote several articles and books about Florida history. He would be appointed to be State Librarian in 1927. At this time the State Library was housed in the basement of the Capital building. Later in 1949, it would be moved to the  Florida Supreme Court building once construction was complete. Cash would help grow the collection from 1,500 uncatalogued volumes to over 50,000 volumes, with a particular interest in rare books and volumes. He would eventually retire from the State Library in 1951.

The State Librarian of Florida is Amy L. Johnson, appointed in 2015. Previous State Librarians were Cecil Beach, 1971- 1977; Barratt Wilkins, 1977-2003; and Judith A. Ring, 2003-2015.

Holdings
State Government Records
Local Government Records
Manuscripts (Non-Government Records)
Florida Photographic Collection
Genealogical Collection
Legislative Acts Committee Records
Civil War Records
Military Service & Pension Records
Florida Folklife Collection

See also
Florida Historical Society
Florida Memory Program
Florida Photographic Collection
Museum of Florida History
W.T. Cash

References

External links
 Florida Department of State, Division of Library and Information Services
 Florida Department of State, Florida State Archives
 Florida Memory

Buildings and structures in Tallahassee, Florida
State agencies of Florida
Libraries in Florida
Florida
Florida
History of Florida
1845 establishments in Florida
Libraries established in 1845
Public libraries in Florida
Government agencies established in 1845